"Chance of Lovin' You" is a song co-written and recorded by American country music artist Earl Thomas Conley.  It was released in August 1984 as the lead single from the album Treadin' Water.  The song was Conley's seventh number one country hit.  The single went to number one for one week and spent a total of fourteen weeks on the country chart.  The song was written by Conley and Randy Scruggs.

Chart performance

References

1984 singles
1984 songs
Earl Thomas Conley songs
Songs written by Randy Scruggs
Songs written by Earl Thomas Conley
RCA Records singles